Giuseppe Giulietti may refer to:

Giuseppe Giulietti (politician) (born 1953), Italian politician
Giuseppe Giulietti (trade unionist) (1879–1953), Italian trade unionist
Giuseppe Maria Giulietti (1847–1881), Italian explorer